The Pavilhão Dream Space is a private-owned sports arena located in Kikuxi, Viana, Luanda. The arena, has a 2,500-seat capacity, which was introduced in 2010, with hardwood flooring, and can be used for sports such as basketball, handball, volleyball and roller hockey.

Dreamspace has been the home ground of Angolan basketball side Recreativo do Libolo

References

Luanda
Basketball venues in Angola
Volleyball venues in Angola
Handball venues in Angola